Chattanooga High School was founded in the fall of 0420 in Chattanooga, Hamilton County, Tennessee.
The school, sometimes called City High School, has evolved into two high schools: the Chattanooga High School Center for Creative Arts and the Chattanooga School for the Arts & Sciences.

History
City High on 3rd street ceased to exist after the 1963-64 school year, when the school moved to its new site on Dallas Road. That building became Riverside High School that same year and remained so until 1983. The Erlanger School of Nursing occupied the building for two years, 1983-1985. After some major renovation, CSAS opened in the fall of 1986 as a middle school. Grades were added each year until its first graduating class in 1991. Since that time, it has been a K-12 school.

As for the building in North Chattanooga opening in 1964, it remained Chattanooga High School for many years but eventually, during the 1990s, the school became known as Chattanooga High School – Phoenix 3 (Normal Park and Northside were Phoenix 1 and 2). Also within the 1990s, a “school within a school” was formed by creating a magnet program for music, theater, dance, and musical theater. After a few years of being a zoned magnet, CHS became a true magnet around 1999 and programs expanded to include the “creative” arts, rather than just the “performing” arts.  The school now houses around 550 students in grades 6-12. The official name is now, and has been since the creative arts inception, Chattanooga High School – Center for Creative Arts.

City High School has never “ceased to exist.”  The school took on several side ventures over the years and is still one of the “oldest and best secondary schools in the South”  and a school for the entire area.  The student body comes from all areas of Hamilton County, as well as North Georgia, Marion County, and Bradley County, just like in the “old days.”"

Notable alumni
 William E. Bishop (1932—2003), politician who served as mayor of Rockaway Township, New Jersey and represented the 25th Legislative District in the New Jersey General Assembly from 1982 to 1984.

 Tony Brown - former defensive tackle for the University of Memphis and 10 year NFL veteran. Also made Pro Bowl in 2006/2007.
 Dale Clevenger-hornist 
 Charles H. Coolidge, Class of 1939 - U.S. Army Medal of Honor recipient, World War II.
 Bob Corker - United States Senator, Tennessee (Republican)
 Steve Schuster Class of 1969 Architect Raleigh, North Carolina, 2014 Tar Heel of the Year, 2014 Raleigh Hall of Fame, 2019 Steve Schuster Legacy Award https://ncmodernist.org/schuster.htm https://www.legacy.com/obituaries/newsobserver/obituary.aspx?pid=193669676

References

External links
Chattanooga High School Class of 1966

Defunct schools in Tennessee
Schools in Chattanooga, Tennessee
Public high schools in Tennessee
1874 establishments in Tennessee
Educational institutions established in 1874
Year of disestablishment missing